Bombaat is a 2008 Indian Kannada-language action film directed by D. Rajendra Babu (in his 50th film) and produced by Rockline Venkatesh. The film stars Ganesh and Ramya.

Plot 

Shalini, the daughter of a police commissioner Ananthakrishnan, lands in the city only to find that a street rowdy Anand alias Ganesha is on a rampage. But little does she know that Anand is a Good Samaritan at heart.

Meanwhile, Shalini comes across a sadist who wants to marry her at any cost. He is also the son of a big mafia don. The mafia group goes to Shalini's father's house to force the marriage. Shalini's father seeks the help of Anand and makes his daughter stay with him for a month in his den. How Anand saves Shalini and what happens to the bad guys make up the rest of the story.

Cast 
 Ganesh as Anand alias Ganesha
 Ramya as Shalini
 Avinash as Ananthakrishnan, Shalini's father
 Mukesh Rishi as Mafia Don
 Vinaya Prasad
 Rahul Dev
 Adi Lokesh as Sadist
 Shobh Raaj
 Guru Dutt

Production 

Ganesh worked out to play a tough guy in the film. Ramya was cast as a non-resident Indian. The songs were shot in Germany, Switzerland, Austria and Italy. Ramya shot for this film at the same time as the unreleased Bhimoo's Bang Bang Kids and Mussanje Maathu. Ganesh got injured while doing the splits. Shooting finished in March 2008.

Soundtrack 

The music of Bombaat was composed by Mano Murthy who previously worked with Ganesh in Mungaru Male and Cheluvina Chittara. Lyrics were by Jayanth Kaikini and Kaviraj. Bangalore Mirror opined that "Amid high expectations from Mano, for a Ganesh starrer, Bombaat’s soundtrack just about manages to stay afloat.

Release and reception 
Bombaat was released around the same time as Ramya-starrer Antu Intu Preeti Bantu. A critic from Sify called the story "water thin" and opined that "Added to it is the mother sentiment plus Mano Murthy’s rehashed tunes from his earlier films, makes it messy." R G Vijayasarathy of Rediff.com gave the film a rating of two out of five stars and opined that "All this might just appeal to Ganesh's fans despite the poor script". Deccan Herald said, "Bombaat is better left alone for a quickest burial at the boxoffice and one’s money better spent at bhel-puris, badushahs, chais, cappuccinos, and Cafe au Laits than let Bombaat make bheja-fry of you brains and mincemeat of your mindspace". The audience criticised Ganesh's characterisation. Rajendra Babu cast Ramya in Aryan (2014) after he liked her performance in this film.

Box office 
The initial collections were high, but the film later became a box office failure after the collections dipped. The film flopped along with Ramya's Antu Intu Preeti Bantu.

References

External links 
 

2000s Kannada-language films
2008 films
Films scored by Mano Murthy
Indian action films
Rockline Entertainments films
Films directed by D. Rajendra Babu